Special Data Dissemination Standard (SDDS) is an International Monetary Fund standard to guide member countries in the dissemination of national statistics to the public.

It was established in April 1996.

Members 
There are currently 65 members.
 Argentina
 Armenia (November 7, 2003; 54th member)
 Australia
 Austria
 Belarus
 Belgium
 Brazil
 Bulgaria
 Canada
 Chile
 China
 Colombia
 Costa Rica
 Croatia
 Czech Republic
 Denmark
 Ecuador
 Egypt
 El Salvador
 Estonia
 Finland
 France
 Germany
 Greece
 Hong Kong
 Hungary
 Iceland
 India
 Indonesia
 Ireland
 Israel
 Italy
 Japan
 Kazakhstan
 Korea
 Kyrgyz Republic
 Latvia
 Lithuania
 Luxembourg
 Malaysia
 Mauritius
 Mexico
 Moldova
 Morocco
 Netherlands
 Norway
 Peru
 Philippines
 Poland
 Portugal
 Romania
 Russian Federation
 Saudi Arabia
 Senegal
 Singapore
 Slovak Republic
 Slovenia
 South Africa
 Spain
 Sri Lanka
 Sweden
 Switzerland
 Thailand
 Tunisia
 Turkey
 Ukraine
 United Kingdom
 United States
 Uruguay
 West Bank and Gaza ("Palestine" as of April 19, 2012; 71st member)

References

External links 
 SDDS - Overview, IMF
 Subscribing Countries, IMF

International Monetary Fund
1996 introductions